Haylie Ecker (born 9 October 1975) is an Australian performer, writer, artistic director, and the former first violinist and co-founding member of the multi-platinum selling classical crossover string quartet Bond. With Bond she sold over 4 million records and accrued 43 platinum and gold records internationally. She left Bond in 2008 to become a mother. She plays a 1751 J.B. Guadagnini.

Career 
Ecker moved to London in 1995 on a music scholarship to later gain First Class Honours BMus-GSMD and a postgraduate diploma in Advanced Solo Studies from Guildhall School of Music and Drama. She won the Guildhall School Of Music And Drama's Maurice Warshaw Prize for Chausson's Poeme, and The Ivan Sutton Award for chamber music.

Ecker toured Japan playing Tchaikovsky Violin Concerto in nine cities, with Western Australian Youth Orchestra 1997. She later played with Luxembourg Philharmonia.

In 1998, pushing boundaries, Ecker co-founded Bond with three of her friends, alongside music producers Mel Bush and Mike Batt. Bond launched their recording and performing career to a sold-out concert at London's Royal Albert Hall, which was later released through Decca as a concert DVD: Live At Albert Hall. The DVD went on to win platinum status in the US along with other international regions.

2001–2010 
Ecker worked with Magnus Fiennes on the animated cartoon series Freefonix in which she plays the character Syun, who has the superpower to manipulate time via extraordinary violin skills. Ecker is a featured artist on Zucchero Fornaciari's album "Zu & Co." on the platinum award-winning track Everybody's Gotta Learn Sometime, (Parlophone). Ecker presents for Classical Destinations Education Series 1, released internationally in 2007.

Ecker debated against British Cultural commentator Norman Lebrecht on BBC Breakfast, which led to further invitations to debate current music issues on British media, including The Mozart Effect on LebrechtLive for BBC Radio 3 and a discussion on The Music Manifesto and music education with Julian Lloyd Webber on BBC2 TV's Lunchtime Show. Ecker recently toured with and recorded on Oi Va Voi's latest album.

In 2008 Ecker arranged and recorded the strings for the BAFTA-nominated film Adulthood.

Ecker left Bond in 2008 and moved to Hong Kong with her family. She took a break to have children and focus on her family.

2011–present 
In 2011 Ecker co-founded and was artistic director of PLAY!, a highbrow classical concert series for children, under the umbrella group of Premier Performances Hong Kong (www.pphk.org). As Artistic Director, she collaborated with artists such as Brooklyn Rider, Alpin Hong, Freddy Kempf, and Dobrinka Tabakova. She collaborated with Tabakova to curate an adaption of Saint-Saëns's Carnival of the Animals for Chinese New Year, which premiered at the 2013 Hong Kong International Chamber Music Festival, and is in the process of being published as a coffee table book.

In 2012 Ecker performed a solo arrangement of Saint-Saëns Danse Macabre, with Orchestre Lamoureux and Faycal Karoui for Jardin de Tuileries' first ever outdoor concerts.

In 2013 Ecker recorded with award-winning film composer Ilan Eshkeri. In 2013 she recorded the violin solos for the BAFTA-nominated The Snowdog and The Snowman.

Between 2011 and 2014 Ecker was a writer for Sassy Mama HK, contributing music mixes for holiday events. She also contributed as a writer for Time Out Hong Kong.

Ecker continues her solo classical violin career in addition to playing with other musicians.

Selected performances 
Selected performances
 Born to it – Haylie Ecker (strings) [Freefonix]
 Zucchero FT Vaness Carlton & Haylie Ecker – Everybody's got to learn sometime
 Haylie Ecker – Classical Destinations
 Danse Macabre de Saint-Saëns – Haylie Ecker
 Sahara by Bond
 Arms Open Wide Adulthood (Instrumental)

Filmography 
 Johnny English (2003)
 XXX: State of the Union (2005)

Prizes won 
 Guildhall School of Music and Drama's Maurice Warshaw Prize for interpretation of Chausson's Poeme for Violin and Piano. (1997)
 Guildhall School of Music and Drama's Ivan Sutton Prize for Chamber music. (1998)
 Sevenoaks Young Musician of the Year. (1997)
 Royal Overseas League chamber music prize (Orlando Piano Trio with Stephen Depledge (piano) and Alexander Somov (cello)). (1999)

Publications 
Orchestra tour part of strong legacy, 30 November 2014, The West Australian
 That Mama: Haylie Ecker, 24 December 2013, Sassy Mama
 Classic Makeover, 14 August 2004, Sydney Morning Herald
Haylie Ecker is Schwing, 8 September 2004, ABC Radio
Bond adds another string to its bow, 4 November 2004, The Age
An evening with Bond, 3 December 2004, Musical Discoveries
The Bond girls aiming to leave classical music world shaken and stirred, 3 August 2000, The Guardian
'They're out of tune – not us', 28 October 2000, The Telegraph UK

Education 
Ecker was educated at the all-girls' Penrhos College.

She received a First Class Honours Degree in Music and a Postgraduate Degree in Advanced Solo Studies from London's Guildhall School of Music and Drama.

Public image 
Haylie is a Public Advocate of music in education at Musica Viva Australia and is also a current council member of Australian Youth Orchestra (2015–2018).

References

1975 births
Living people
Alumni of the Guildhall School of Music and Drama
Australian violinists
Bond (band) members
Musicians from Perth, Western Australia
Women classical violinists
21st-century women musicians
21st-century violinists